Muluken Melesse (born 1954) is an Ethiopian singer and drummer. He later abandoned his music career to involve himself in the Pentecostal Church.

Biography
Muluken was born in Gojjam, a province in northern Ethiopia now a Zonal Administration in the Amhara regional state. When he was six, he moved to Addis Ababa with his uncle. In 1966, aged 12, he began his musical career singing at night clubs and in groups founded by night club owners, with his first song to be performed on stage, Enate Sitewoldgne Metchi Amakerchign.

His first song on vinyl was Hedetch Alu, which was recorded in 1972 by Girma Bèyènè (piano and arrangements), Tesfa Mariam Kidane (tenor sax), Tekle Adhanonm (guitar), Fekade Amde Meskel (bass), Tesfay Mekonnen (drums) and Melesse himself. In 1975, he recorded his second song, "Wetetie Mare and Ete Endenesh Gedawo", with Equator Band. While the rest of the band emigrated to the United States of America, Muluken remained to join the Pentecostal Church in the 1980s, having ended his musical career.

While he remained one of the best voices of the Ethiopian 1970s, unlike other performers of the time, Muluken never seems to have been taped by the official state television.

Sometime in the early 1980s Muluken became a born-again Christian, mostly associated with the Ethiopian Evangelical movement.

Muluken has supposedly been repeatedly approached to return to his secular music roots but his refusal has, as of April 2018, has been steadfast. Recently he has had some interviews where he decried he was misquoted by magazine editors in Ethiopia. He came out on EBS TV to set the record straight.

Muluken is married and resides in Washington, DC metropolitan area. He ministers by traveling all over the world. Famous songs by Melesse include "Menew Kerefede", "Yeregeme Lebe", "Lebo Ney", "Kumetish Loga New", "Wedijesh Nebere" and "Tenesh Kelbe Lay". His song "Nanu Nanu Ney" was an old favorite.

One of Muluken's quality as a musician is to work on the lyrics given to him by the songwriters. He never takes every word as is presented to him. He changes a lot of the writing to suit his style, sometimes to the point that he seems to have co-written the music. He was lucky that most of the writers understood him to consent to his whims. Tesfaye Lemessa and Alemtsehay Wodajo are among the most celebrated song writers whose work he performed.

References
GeoCities , retrieved on March 10, 2007
Melesse information page retrieved on March 10, 2007
Fan site 'Music' page: 
nanu nanu ney
agerwa wasa megena
lakilgn
sewnetwa
yelbe endiders

1954 births
Living people
20th-century Ethiopian male singers
Ethiopian Pentecostals